United Nations Security Council Resolution 364, adopted on December 13, 1974, noted reports from the Secretary-General and Government of Cyprus about the prevailing conditions on the island, as well as General Assembly resolution 3212 and previous resolutions.

The Council then extended the stationing of the United Nations Peace-keeping Force in Cyprus for another six months until June 15, 1975, in the expectation that by then sufficient progress towards a final solution would make at least a partial withdrawal possible and again appealed to all parties to the conflict to extend their full co-operation to the Force.

The resolution was adopted with 14 votes to none; China did not participate in voting.

See also
 Cyprus dispute
 List of United Nations Security Council Resolutions 301 to 400 (1971–1976)
 Turkish Invasion of Cyprus

References
Text of the Resolution at undocs.org

External links
 

 0364
 0364
December 1974 events